Senna sophera is a shrub, glabrous, about 3 m. in height. The compound leaves with 8-12 paired leaflets acute and tapering; bear rachies with single gland at the base. It has yellow flowers in  carymbose racemes.

Common names of Senna sophera include algarrobilla, kasunda, baner. It was formerly called Cassia sophera in English.  It is known as kasaundi in Hindi, and kolkasunda (কল্কাসুন্দা) in Bengali.

Possibly originating in Bangladesh, today the plant is found in most tropical countries. Root bark in used for preparation of the medicine. It has been used by ancient Indian physicians for its efficacy in respiratory disorders.

References

External links

sophera
Plants described in 1753
Taxa named by Carl Linnaeus